This article is a list of people associated with Birkbeck, University of London, including alumni, members of faculty and fellows.

Current and former faculty
Georgios Alogoskoufis,  Greek Minister of Economy and Finance from March 2004 till January 2009.
 Anthony Bale, medievalist
 Julia Bell, author
J. D. Bernal, pioneer of X-ray crystallography
 Derek Barton, organic chemist and Nobel Laureate for Chemistry, 1969
 Antony Beevor, historian
 Patrick Blackett, Baron Blackett, professor and Nobel Laureate for Physics, 1948
 Sir Tom Blundell, crystallographer, FRS
 David Bohm, quantum physicist
 Andrew Donald Booth, head of Numerical Automation
 Kathleen Booth née Britten, computer scientist
 C. Delisle Burns (1879-1942), atheist and secularist writer and lecturer
 Ian Christie, professor of film and media history
 Steven Connor, professor
 Ian Crawford, Professor of Planetary Science and Astrobiology
 Diana Coole, social scientist 
 Costas Douzinas, law professor
 T. S. Eliot, Nobel Laureate for Literature 1948, publisher, playwright, literary and social critic
 Hilda Ellis Davidson, academic and English antiquarian
 Martina Evans, poet
 Richard J. Evans, Regius Professor of Modern History at Cambridge
 Martin Paul Eve, professor
 Dame Millicent Fawcett, suffragist
 Orlando Figes, professor of history
 Ben Fine, professor
 Rosalind Franklin, crystallographer
 Hugh Gaitskell, lecturer
 Caroline Goodson, medievalist
 A. C. Grayling, philosopher
 Vittorio Grilli, Italy's economy and finances minister (Monti cabinet) from 2012 to 2013.
 Richard Hamblyn, lecturer in creative writing
 Vanessa Harding, professor of London history
 Basil Hiley, quantum physicist and emeritus professor
 Paul Hirst, professor
 Eric Hobsbawm, professor of History
 Thomas Hodgskin, lecturer in economic theory
 Kenneth Holmes, crystallographer
 Elizabeth Hounsell, carbohydrate scientist
 C. E. M. Joad, Reader in Philosophy, author and popular broadcaster
 Mark Johnson, professor
 Charlotte Jolles, Professor, historian
 Russell Celyn Jones, professor of creative writing
 Annette Karmiloff-Smith, professor
 Anthony Julius, visiting professor
 Aaron Klug, crystallographer and Nobel Laureate for Chemistry, 1982
 Jon Lansman, Labour Party activist
Gail Lewis, academic and activist
 Toby Litt, author, lecturer
 Joni Lovenduski, political scientist
 Mark Mazower, professor
 Louis Mordell, researcher in mathematics
 Laura Mulvey, professor of film and media studies
 Jeremy K. Nicholson, professor of biological chemistry
 Roger Penrose, theoretical physicist and Nobel Laureate for Physics, 2020
 Nikolaus Pevsner, professor
 Ben Pimlott, professor
 Lucy Riall, historian
 Helen Saibil, molecular biologist, FRS, FMedSci
 Roger Scruton, professor
 Lynne Segal, professor
 Colin Teevan, professor of playwriting
 Dame Janet Thornton, structural bioinformatics, FRS, Director EBI
 Li Wei, academic, linguist
 Ralph Vaughan Williams, lecturer, composer
 Tony Wright, politician, distinguished professor at Birkbeck
 Slavoj Žižek, philosopher

Presidents
 Eric Hobsbawm, President of the college, Marxist historian of the rise of industrial capitalism, socialism, and nationalism
 Joan Bakewell, broadcaster, critic, President of Birkbeck College
 George Birkbeck (1776–1841), doctor, philanthropist and founder of Birkbeck

Masters and Vice Chancellors
 John Redcliffe Maud (1939–1943)
 E.H. Warmington (acting, 1950–1951)
 John Francis Lockwood (1951–1965; Vice-Chancellor of the University of London 1955–1958)
 E.H. Warmington (acting, 1965–1966)
 Kenneth Hare (1966–1968)
 Ronald Tress (1968–1977)
 Tessa Blackstone, Baroness Blackstone (1987–1997; Vice-Chancellor of University of Greenwich)
 Timothy O'Shea (1998–2002; Principal of the University of Edinburgh)
 David Latchman (2003–present)

Alumni
 Mukhlesur Rahman Chowdhury, politician, editor, Minister and former Adviser to the President of Bangladesh
 Chris Abani, writer
 Kemi Badenoch, politician and Member of Parliament, candidate for Leader of the Conservative Party and Prime Minister of the United Kingdom
 Marian Bell, economist; former member of the Monetary Policy Committee
 Luciana Berger, politician and Member of Parliament
 Annie Besant, theosophist
 Simon Bird, actor and comedian
 Oliver Chris, actor
 Alex Corbisiero, England and British Lions rugby player
 Beth Cordingly, actress
 David Cox, statistician
 Bernard Crick, political theorist
 Juliet Davenport, businesswoman
 Alan Davey, civil servant; current Chief executive of British Arts Council
 Edward Davey, politician and Member of Parliament
 Dido, singer
 Jennifer Donnelly, writer
 Samir El-Youssef, writer
 Tracey Emin, artist
 Nissim Ezekiel, professor, poet
 Rachel Glennerster, economist, Chief Economist at the Department for International Development 
Tomás González Estrada, Colombian politician, former minister of energy
 Marcus Garvey, founder Universal Negro Improvement Association and African Communities League
 Eliane Glaser, writer, broadcaster
 Julia Goldsworthy, politician; former Liberal Democrat MP for Falmouth and Camborne
 Bear Grylls, adventurer, author and television presenter
 John Joseph Haldane, philosopher
 Frank Hartley, vice-chancellor of the university
 Zhu Hua, applied linguist
 Vernon Ingram, Fellow of the Royal Society
 Paul Johnson, economist, Director of Institute of Fiscal Studies
 William Joyce, deputy Leader of the British Union of Fascists, Nazi wartime broadcaster and convicted traitor
 Oliver Kamm, journalist 
 James Lovelock, developer of the Gaia Hypothesis
 Ramsay MacDonald, politician; first Labour Prime Minister of the United Kingdom
 John McDonnell, politician
 Denis MacShane, politician
 Leonard Mandel, nuclear physicist
 Ehsan Masood, science writer and editor of Research Fortnight
 Ram Charan Mehrotra, organometallic chemist, Shanti Swarup Bhatnagar laureate
 Ernest Millington, politician
 Seumas Milne, journalist and political aide
 Lisa Nandy, politician and Member of Parliament
 Jesse Norman, politician and Member of Parliament
 Nerina Pallot, singer
 Nick Palmer, politician and former Member of Parliament
 Arthur Wing Pinero, actor, stage director and dramatist
 Daisy Ridley, actress
 J. Philippe Rushton, psychologist
 John Rowan (psychologist), psychologist
 Jenny Rowe, Chief Executive, UK Supreme Court
 Richard Sambrook, broadcaster, formerly director of the BBC World
 Frank Sando, former International Cross-Country Champion
 Andy Saull, rugby player
 Helen Sharman, chemist and cosmonaut
 Joost Smiers, academic
 Nick Smith, politician
 Vaughan Smith, soldier, journalist, cameraman, and social entrepreneur
 Laura Solomon, writer
 Nicola Spence, Chief Plant Health Officer, Defra
 William Stanley, inventor, engineer and philanthropist
 Kim Thomson, stage, film and television actress
 Mark P. Taylor, economist, Dean of Olin Business School at Washington University in St. Louis
Laurie Taylor, sociologist
 Tracey Thorn, pop star, singer with Everything but the Girl
 Ronald Tress, economist
 Kitty Ussher, British economist and former Labour Party politician
Alfred Russel Wallace, naturalist, explorer, geographer, anthropologist, and biologist. He is best known for independently conceiving the theory of evolution through natural selection
 Rob Williams, rower, silver medallist in the 2012 Olympics
 Sidney James Webb, 1st Baron Passfield, founder of the London School of Economics
 Jah Wobble, musician/writer
 Wai Hnin Pwint Thon, Burmese Muslim political activist
 Sidin Vadukut, columnist, writer and blogger
 Claudia Webbe, Labour MP
 Omeima Mudawi-Rowlings , deaf British-Sudanese textile artist based in Brighton

Fellows
 Edward Davey, Secretary of State for Energy and Climate Change, Liberal Democrat Member of Parliament for Kingston and Surbiton
 Frank Dobson, Labour politician
 Dame Vivien Duffield, philanthropist
 Sir Richard J. Evans, historian
 Dame Julia Goodfellow, former Chief Executive of the Biotechnology and Biological Sciences Research Council
 Sir Peter Lampl, educationalist and philanthropist, founder of the Sutton Trust
 Leonard Wolfson, Baron Wolfson

References

Birkbeck, University of London
 
Birkbeck